The fifth season of the television comedy Portlandia began airing on IFC in the United States on January 8, 2015, consisting a total of 10 episodes. The series stars Fred Armisen and Carrie Brownstein.

Cast

Main cast
 Fred Armisen
 Carrie Brownstein

Special guest cast
 Kyle MacLachlan as Mr. Mayor
 Paul Simon as himself

Guest stars

Episodes

References

External links 

Ultimate Character and Episode Guide
 

Portlandia (TV series)
2015 American television seasons